Cornellias F. "Jay" Taylor, Jr. (October 3, 1967 – July 4, 1998) was an American professional basketball player.

Taylor, a  guard from East Aurora High School in Aurora, Illinois, played college basketball at Eastern Illinois.  He finished his career with 1,926 points and graduated as EIU's all-time leading scorer (since passed by Henry Domercant).  In his senior year, he averaged 23.8 points per game and was named the 1989 The Mid-Continent Conference Player of the Year.

Following his college career, Taylor was not drafted in the 1989 NBA Draft.  However, he made the New Jersey Nets' roster and stuck with the team until December.  He finished the season with the Wichita Falls Texans of the Continental Basketball Association (CBA).  Taylor played for four more years in the CBA - with the Grand Rapids Hoops, Rochester Renegade, Oklahoma City Cavalry and Rockford Lightning.

Taylor died in a house fire on July 4, 1998.  He was inducted into the Eastern Illinois University athletic Hall of Fame in 1999.

References

1967 births
1998 deaths
Basketball players from Illinois
Eastern Illinois Panthers men's basketball players
Grand Rapids Hoops players
New Jersey Nets players
Rochester Renegade players
Rockford Lightning players
Shooting guards
Sportspeople from Aurora, Illinois
Undrafted National Basketball Association players
Wichita Falls Texans players
American men's basketball players
American expatriate basketball people in the Philippines
Philippine Basketball Association imports
San Miguel Beermen players
Magnolia Hotshots players
Deaths from fire in the United States